Kalemba is a surname with multiple origins. Notable people with this surname include:

 Alinafe Kalemba, Malawi Anglican bishop
 Gérard Mulumba Kalemba (1937–2020), Congolese Catholic prelate
 Pascal Kalemba (1979–2012), Congolese footballer
 Stanisław Kalemba (born 1947), Polish politician
 Zane Kalemba (born 1985), American ice hockey player

See also